The United States Congress established the Joint Planning and Development Office (JPDO) in 2003 to plan and coordinate the development of the Next Generation Air Transportation System (NextGen). The JPDO is a multi-agency public/private initiative to include: United States Department of Transportation, United States Department of Defense, Department of Commerce, Department of Homeland Security, Federal Aviation Administration, National Aeronautics and Space Administrations, and White House Office of Science and Technology Policy.  Congress ended funding for JPDO in 2014.

Profile

The NextGen portfolio includes large-scale investments, research, and operational changes that will profoundly impact the capabilities of the nation’s air transportation system. This includes developments in air traffic control, airspace management, satellite-based navigation, security (both at the airport and in the air), digital communications, net-centric operations, and changes in the way aviation weather information is gathered and disseminated throughout the system.

With this in mind, and given the broad impact of these changes, the concept of a joint office, one that can manage the development of the NextGen architecture and integrated work plan, has become especially important.

Since its inception, the JPDO has been in the development of a framework for planning NextGen, identifying and prioritizing key multi-agency concerns, and driving consensus in the development of investment choices and decisions.

The JPDO is governed by a Senior Policy Committee (SPC) that is made up of Cabinet-level representatives from each of the JPDO’s government partners. The SPC is chaired by the Secretary of Transportation.

The scope of the JPDO’s planning is broad. It engages the collaborative energies of the departments and agencies, the academic community, research, and private sectors. It covers a time span of nearly two decades and calls for a unique level of integration in the planning and budgeting of critical investments in the national transportation system. This approach is representative of a new paradigm in the way government pursues large-scale transformational initiatives, particularly those that encompass a broad range of mission areas, agencies, and the private sector.

The JPDO’s Joint Planning Environment (JPE) is a key tool in these planning efforts. Through its Enterprise Architecture (the architectural blueprint), Concept of Operations, and Integrated Work Plan (all publicly accessible on the Internet), the JPE offers a level of transparency and accountability that the Federal Government expects. This kind of access is unprecedented. The concept is a critical part of implementing a Federated Enterprise Architecture.

A New Paradigm in Government Management

The JPDO mission, and what the organization is intended to achieve, has at times been called “an experimental concept” in government management. NextGen involves a wide range of carefully timed and integrated activities, and while having significant benefits in the near- and mid-terms, it is also heavily focused on the long-term development of America’s aviation infrastructure. This kind of challenge necessitates an entirely new paradigm in the way government functions to include the way it plans, makes decisions, resources, budgets, and in the way it reacts to opportunities and challenges.

Drivers for Change

America’s air transportation system is responsible for over 5% of the nation’s GDP and has created 11 million jobs. Operationally, it is the safest system in the world and handles over 750 million passengers each year. However, the critical infrastructure supporting the system is facing significant limitations.

The system relies on radar and point-to-point beacons to control and manage the flow of air traffic. These are all World-War-II-era technologies that make it difficult for the system to expand or to adjust to changes in system operations. If the aviation infrastructure is going to be able to meet the needs expected in the 21st century, it needs to be sufficiently scalable to support additional demand, and flexible enough to accommodate changes in the aviation industry as well as the introduction of new aircraft. Further, NextGen, through improved operations, new aircraft designs, and more efficient routes, will be able to recognize significant benefits in terms of reduced environmental impact. That, in a nutshell, is the objective of NextGen.

The JPDO’s role in this change environment is to develop the multi-agency planning and implementation structure to make NextGen a reality. This includes outlining the key tasks and enablers needed to develop and implement satellite-based control of aircraft, net-centric digital communications, advanced weather applications, new concepts in airspace management, and more efficient and effective security management.

These changes and new technologies will be the basis for a transformation of this critical component of America’s transportation infrastructure.

The Joint Planning Environment

One of the most critical objectives for the JPDO has been to develop the multi-agency planning structure. The framework for this work is the Joint Planning Environment (JPE). The JPE brings together the key planning tools that define NextGen. This includes the Concept of Operations (ConOps), the Enterprise Architecture, and the Integrated Work Plan (IWP). The ConOps is the description of how the NextGen system will work. The Enterprise Architecture provides a view of how NextGen will function and what capabilities need to be developed. In addition, it provides data from which analysis and modeling can be performed to assess options for determining the best business case for each set of investments and solutions.

This structure then informs the key how-to component of the JPE, the IWP. The IWP, driven by the ConOps and the Enterprise Architecture, along with the collaborative involvement of each government partner and with significant private sector input, lays out each of the operational improvements and enablers necessary to make NextGen a reality, across bands of functional/operational segments. The IWP outlines the work of each partner agency, the timing for these efforts, the key research, policy, and implementation objectives, and defines how they fit together.

In order to build collaboration and to demonstrate transparency, the JPE is publicly available at https://web.archive.org/web/20090108030528/http://jpe.jpdo.gov/ee/ or through the JPDO’s Web site https://web.archive.org/web/20080509140423/http://www.jpdo.gov/. The JPE, through a series of over 40 different reports, allows users to study the NextGen planning tools in terms of linkages, respective departmental and agency responsibilities, and timelines. This provides the user with the opportunity to see how NextGen development might be impacted by changes in schedule, funding, or relative priorities.

NextGen Institute

The JPDO is focused on establishing a new level of collaboration with other government departments and agencies, but it also has a mission to develop a strong relationship with the private sector. To this end, the JPDO created an entirely new organization called the NextGen Institute (http://www.ncat.com/ngats/index.html). The Institute provides the mechanism for industry to participate on an equal footing with their Federal counterparts in developing NextGen products and providing input on important policies. Currently the Institute has over 230 members.

The principal involvement for industry is through a series of joint, public/private sector Working Groups. Each group covers a specific subject area that is important to NextGen’s development. In addition, each group has an industry and government co-chair, and has been tasked with providing extensive input into the NextGen planning process, as well as developing important products for use in future planning and implementation efforts.

Data-Driven Decision Making

NextGen represents a series of long-term investments in the national air transportation system, as well as a continuing long-term research commitment. It also requires a significant level of investment on the part of the private sector. To guide this investment the JPDO is developing a business case that will provide an investment analysis framework for future decision making and prioritization.

Key to this work has been an extensive modeling and simulation effort aimed at developing critical information on the structure of future NextGen costs and the expected benefit from NextGen improvements. This structure creates a “series of trade spaces” where alternatives and various scenarios can be explored, analyzed, and compared. The objective is to develop a long-term, NextGen decision making model that is linked to the JPE and is heavily data-driven.

Environmental Benefits

NextGen offers a new approach to managing the environmental impact of aviation. Several air traffic procedures currently in use provide more efficient aircraft trajectories that reduce the amount of fuel aircraft burn during flight. These directly reduce emissions and noise. Over the longer term, gains provided by satellite-based navigation systems will offer more efficient routes that reduce the amount of time aircraft spend in flight. Engine plant and aircraft design are other aspects of the work being undertaken by the JPDO partner agencies. For instance, NASA, through its research work on engine plant design is developing lighter and more efficient engines that will lead to a substantial reduction in the output of pollutants.

Some Examples of Ongoing Multi-Agency Initiatives

The JPDO, working closely with its government partners, has identified several valuable opportunities to leverage technology, expertise, and ongoing research to foster collaboration on key NextGen issues. Some ongoing examples of this work include:

Net-Centric Operations

One of the most critical challenges to NextGen is to develop a net-centric capability for the national airspace system that will provide advanced exchange of operational data. This includes not only the exchange of information between aircraft and the ground, but also between aircraft in flight. The Department of Defense has a long-standing commitment to net-centric technology, and now through the JPDO is developing the initial operating concept and key references for advanced network connectivity to support NextGen. This kind of leveraging of existing technologies and capabilities is one of the JPDO’s most important objectives.

Integrated Surveillance

Another key JPDO contribution to the development of NextGen involves integrated surveillance. Integrated surveillance is the integration of cooperative and non-cooperative surveillance data in a user-defined environment. As NextGen initiatives, such as Automatic Dependent Surveillance Broadcast (ADS-B), a satellite-based navigation system, become available, it will be important to determine the optimum mix between cooperative surveillance capabilities like ADS-B and non-cooperative radar surveillance-based capabilities.

At an inter-agency surveillance summit in December 2008, the JPDO was asked to develop a concept of operations and architecture for integrated national aviation surveillance. The work will include development of a funding profile and a long-term recommendation regarding future system governance.

Weather

Improved weather information is essential for NextGen to recognize some of its most important benefits. However, the challenge for the JPDO has been to organize the weather research, dissemination, and forecasting work of several different agencies into a cohesive national aviation weather strategy. This effort represented a considerable undertaking and one that involved extensive outreach and collaboration to achieve. The result, under the leadership of the Department of Commerce, and with the active involvement of the Department of Defense, the FAA, and NASA, is an agreement to develop a 4-D Weather Cube. This concept represents a major change in the way aviation weather information is managed. Using the 4-D concept, weather information will be shared with all system users, and will include probabilistic forecasts of expected weather conditions.

Research Coordination

NASA is the principal source of air traffic and aviation research. Historically, one of the most challenging aspects of this work has been the coordination of NASA’s efforts with the operational needs of the FAA. This concern is only heightened by the expanded needs of NextGen. With this in mind, and working with both agencies, the JPDO has established a series of Research Transition Teams to coordinate the development of key research requirements and to better coordinate the evolution of research into operational improvements and new capabilities.

Challenges

The Joint Planning and Development Office represents a substantial cultural change in the way government plans, coordinates, and budgets for a large-scale initiative. Rather than relying on coordination or cooperation on a situation-by-situation basis, the JPDO has brought together all of the government partners to work collaboratively in planning, designing, and implementing the NextGen initiative. However, working with so many different organizations has been a challenge. Each government department and agency has its own unique organizational culture which is reflected in its decision making processes, structure, planning process, and budgeting. Managing this challenge has required an extensive level of outreach, information sharing, collaboration, and negotiation.

One of the challenges in this undertaking has been in maintaining the “honest broker” status that is critical to this change-oriented approach to managing a large-scale initiative. It is important that the JPDO is organizationally positioned in a way that allows it to have sufficient latitude, under the direction of its SPC, to carry out its mission.

References

External links
jpdo.gov - Official Joint Planning and Development Web Site
JPE - Joint Planning Environment
The Vision 100 – Century of Aviation Reauthorization Act - Official Legislation for the Vision 100 Act
Executive Order: Transformation of the National Air Transportation System

Aviation authorities
Air traffic control in the United States